"Drive-in Theater" is Japanese voice actress and singer Maaya Uchida's 1st mini album, released on January 11, 2017.

Mini album contents

Charts

References

2017 EPs
J-pop EPs
Japanese-language EPs
Pony Canyon EPs